Mikael Lennart Tage Stahre (born 5 July 1975) is a Swedish football manager who was most recently the head coach of Allsvenskan club IFK Göteborg.

Management career
Stahre was appointed as AIK's manager on 10 November 2008 immediately following the end of the 2008 AIK campaign under Rikard Norling. For the two previous years he had served as manager of FC Väsby United, whom he first promoted from the third tier of Swedish football to the second tier Superettan. In 2008 Stahre led the team to the middle of the table despite having the youngest squad in the league.

In 2006 Stahre was assistant manager to Norling together with Nebojša Novaković.

Stahre is a national championship winning coach for men's junior after leading the AIK youth side to the title in 2004. He has also trained youth teams at Hammarby IF and Gröndals IK. On 26 April 2010 Panionios F.C. Panionios signed Stahre as the new manager.
On 28 October 2010 Panionios announced the end of cooperation with Mikael Stahre.

Stahre joined IFK Göteborg in 2012.

Mikael Stahre appears in a controversial scene in the Sveriges Television documentary The Referee about top referee Martin Hansson as a match between Halmstad BK and Stahre's team AIK has to be postponed due to crowd pressure.

On 24 November 2017 he was named head coach of Major League Soccer's San Jose Earthquakes. On 17 September 2018, the club announced it had parted ways with Stahre.

On 13 January 2020, Stahre was announced as the new head coach at Sarpsborg 08.

Statistics

Manager

Managerial honours 

AIK
 Allsvenskan: 2009
 Svenska Cupen: 2009
 Supercupen: 2010

IFK Göteborg
 Svenska Cupen: 2012–13

See also
 List of Major League Soccer coaches

References

1975 births
Living people
Swedish football managers
Swedish expatriate football managers
Expatriate football managers in Greece
Expatriate football managers in China
Expatriate soccer managers in the United States
Expatriate football managers in Norway
Swedish expatriate sportspeople in Greece
Swedish expatriate sportspeople in China
Swedish expatriate sportspeople in the United States
Swedish expatriate sportspeople in Norway
AIK Fotboll managers
AFC Eskilstuna managers
IFK Göteborg managers
Panionios F.C. managers
BK Häcken managers
Sarpsborg 08 FF managers
Allsvenskan managers
Eliteserien managers
Sportspeople from Stockholm